Angela Vint is a Canadian actress. She is most noted for her television role as Ziggy McLeod in Traders, for which she was a Gemini Award nominee for Best Supporting Actress in a Drama Program or Series at the 15th Gemini Awards in 2000.

Early life and education 
A native of Oshawa, Ontario, she is a graduate of the theatre program at York University.

Career 
Vint starred in the films 19 Months (2004) and The Baby Formula (2008). She has also appeared in supporting or guest roles in the films The Hunt for the Unicorn Killer, The Safety of Objects, Prince Charming, The Vow and Lars and the Real Girl, and the television series Blue Murder, This Is Wonderland, Across the River to Motor City, Flashpoint, Murdoch Mysteries and The Handmaid's Tale.

Filmography

Film

Television

References

External links

20th-century Canadian actresses
21st-century Canadian actresses
Canadian film actresses
Canadian stage actresses
Canadian television actresses
Actresses from Oshawa
York University alumni
Living people
Year of birth missing (living people)